The following is a list of Special Areas of Conservation in Scotland.

 Abhainn Clais An Eas and Allt a`Mhuilinn
 Achnahaird
 Airds Moss
 Altnaharra
 Amat Woods
 Ardgour Pinewoods
 Ardmeanach
 Ardnamurchan Burns
 Ardvar and Loch a`Mhuilinn Woodlands
 Ascrib, Isay and Dunvegan
 Ballochbuie
 Bankhead Moss, Beith
 Barry Links
 Beinn a' Ghlò
 Beinn Bhàn
 Beinn Dearg
 Beinn Iadain and Beinn na h`Uamha
 Ben Alder and Aonach Beag
 Beinn Heasgarnich
 Ben Lawers
 Ben Lui
 Ben Nevis
 Ben Wyvis
 Berriedale and Langwell Waters
 Berwickshire (and North Northumberland Coast in England)
 Black Loch Moss
 Black Wood of Rannoch
 Blawhorn Moss
 Borders Woods
 Braehead Moss
 Broubster Leans
 Buchan Ness to Collieston
 Burrow Head
 Caenlochan
 Cairngorms
 Caithness and Sutherland Peatlands
 Cape Wrath
 Carn nan Tri-Tighearnan
 Carsegowan Moss
 Cawdor Wood
 Claish Moss and Kentra Moss
 Clyde Valley Woods
 Coalburn Moss
 Cockinhead Moss
 Coille Mhór
 Coladoir Bog
 Coll Machair
 Conon Islands
 Coyles of Muick
 Craigengar
 Craighall Gorge
 Cranley Moss
 Creag Meagaidh
 Creag nan Gamhainn
 Crieff Woods
 Culbin Bar
 Dam Wood
 Dinnet Oakwood
 Dogden Moss
 Dornoch Firth and Morrich More
 Drumochter Hills
 Dun Moss and Forest of Alyth Mires
 Dunkeld – Blairgowrie Lochs
 Durness
 Dykeneuk Moss
 East Caithness Cliffs
 East Mires and Lumbister
 Eilean na Muice Duibhe
 Eileanan agus Sgeiran Lios mór
 Endrick Water
 Fair Isle
 Fannich Hills
 Faray and Holm of Faray
 Feur Lochain
 Firth of Lorn
 Firth of Tay & Eden Estuary
 Flanders Mosses
 Flow of Dergoals
 Foinaven
 Galloway Oakwoods
 Glac na Criche
 Glen Beasdale
 Glen Coe
 Glen Creran Woods
 Glen Shira
 Glen Tanar
 Glenartney Juniper Wood
 Green Hill of Strathdon
 Hascosay
 Hill of Towanreef
 Hoy
 Inchnadamph
 Insh Marshes
 Inverasdale Peatlands
 Invernaver
 Inverpolly
 Isle of May
 Keen of Hamar
 Keltneyburn
 Kilhern Moss
 Kinloch and Kyleakin Hills
 Kinveachy Forest
 Kippenrait Glen
 Kirkcowan Flow
 Ladder Hills
 Langavat
 Ledmore Wood
 Lendalfoot Hills Complex
 Lewis Peatlands
 Lismore Lochs
 Little Gruinard River
 Loch a`Phuill
 Loch Achnacloich
 Loch Creran
 Loch Etive Woods
 Loch Fada
 Loch Laxford
 Loch Lomond Woods
 Loch Maree Complex
 Loch Moidart and Loch Shiel Woods
 Loch nam Madadh
 Loch of Isbister
 Loch of Stenness
 Loch of Wester
 Loch Roag Lagoons
 Loch Ruthven
 Loch Ussie
 Loch Watten
 Lochs Duich, Long and Alsh Reefs
 Lower Findhorn Woods
 Lower River Spey – Spey Bay
 Luce Bay and Sands
 Meall na Samhna
 Merrick Kells
 Methven Moss
 Mingarry Burn
 Mochrum Lochs
 Moffat Hills
 Moidach More
 Mòine Mhór
 Mointeach nan Lochain Dubha
 Mointeach Scadabhaigh
 Monach Islands
 Monadh Mor
 Monadhliath
 Moniack Gorge
 Moorfoot Hills
 Moray Firth
 Morrone Birkwood
 Mortlach Moss
 Morven and Mullachdubh
 Morvern Woods
 Mound Alderwoods
 Mousa
 Muir of Dinnet
 Mull Oakwoods
 Mull of Galloway
 Ness Woods
 North Fetlar
 North Harris
 North Rona
 North Shotts Moss
 North Uist Machair
 Obain Loch Euphoirt
 Oldshoremore and Sandwood
 Onich to North Ballachulish Woods
 Oronsay
 Papa Stour
 Peeswit Moss
 Pitkeathly Mires
 Pitmaduthy Moss
 Raeburn Flow
 Rannoch Moor
 Rassal
 Red Moss of Netherley
 Red Moss, Oldtown
 Reidside Moss
 Rhidorroch Woods
 Rigg – Bile
 Rinns of Islay
 River Bladnoch
 River Borgie
 River Dee
 River Evelix
 River Kerry
 River Moidart
 River Moriston
 River Naver
 River Oykel
 River South Esk
 River Spey
 River Tay
 River Teith
 River Thurso
 River Tweed
 Ronas Hill – North Roe
 Rùm
 Sanday, Orkney
 Sands of Forvie
 Shelforkie
 Shingle Islands
 Sligachan Peatlands
 Slochd
 Solway Firth
 Solway Mosses North
 Sound of Arisaig (Loch Ailort to Loch Ceann Traigh)
 South Uist Machair
 South-East Islay Skerries
 St Abb's Head to Fast Castle
 St Kilda
 Strath
 Strathglass Complex
 Strathy Point
 Stromness Heaths and Coast
 Sullom Voe
 Sunart
 Tarbert Woods
 Taynish and Knapdale Woods
 Tayvallich Juniper and Coast
 The Maim
 The Vadills
 Threepwood Moss
 Tingon
 Tiree Machair
 Tràigh na Berie
 Treshnish Isles
 Trossachs Woods
 Trotternish Ridge
 Tulach Hill and Glen Fender Meadows
 Turclossie Moss
 Turflundie Wood
 Tynron Juniper Wood
 Upper Nithsdale Woods
 Urquhart Bay Wood
 Waukenwae Moss
 West Fannyside Moss
 Whitlaw and Branxholme
 Yell Sound Coast

See also

 List of Special Areas of Conservation in England
 List of Special Areas of Conservation in Wales
 List of Special Areas of Conservation in Northern Ireland

Sources

 JNCC list of UK SACs (accessed 30 October 2006)

 
Lists of protected areas of Scotland